Bik-Karmaly (Bik-Qaramalı) is a rural locality (a selo) and the administrative centre of Bik-Karmalinsky Selsoviet, Davlekanovsky District, Bashkortostan, Russia. The population was 324 as of 2010. There are 2 streets.

Geography 
Bik-Karmaly is located 23 km southeast of Davlekanovo (the district's administrative centre) by road. Zarya is the nearest rural locality.

References 

Rural localities in Davlekanovsky District